John Waterhouse Daniel (January 27, 1845 – January 11, 1933) was a Canadian physician and Conservative politician.

Daniel enlisted in the American Civil war and served as a Surgeon with the 47th Regiment Kentucky Volunteer Mounted Infantry a Union Regiment from October 1863 to December 1864.
 
Daniel served as an assistant surgeon in the United States Army from 1865 to 1871.

After a three-year term as an Alderman in Saint John, New Brunswick, he was elected Mayor, a post he held from 1900 to 1902.

Elected to the House of Commons four times, Daniel represented Saint John federally from 1904 to 1911. Less than a month after his final election in 1911, Daniel resigned, triggering a by-election which John Douglas Hazen won by acclamation. In 1912 Daniel was appointed to the Senate of Canada, where he sat until his death.

External links
 

1845 births
1933 deaths
Conservative Party of Canada (1867–1942) MPs
Members of the House of Commons of Canada from New Brunswick
Canadian military doctors
Canadian senators from New Brunswick
Conservative Party of Canada (1867–1942) senators
Mayors of Saint John, New Brunswick